People of the Comet is a science fiction novel by American writer Austin Hall.  It was first published in book form in 1948 by Griffin Publishing Company in an edition of 900 copies.  The novel was originally serialized in two parts in the magazine Weird Tales beginning in September 1923, as The People of the Comet. The author's own title for the novel was Hop O' My Thumb.

Plot introduction
The novel concerns super-beings who reveal that our solar system is an atom in a larger universe.

Publication history
1923, US, Weird Tales, Pub date September 1923, magazine serialization in 2 parts
1948, US, Griffin Publishing Company , Pub date 1948, Hardback, first book publication
1950, Belgium, comics magazine Bravo, Pub date 23 November 1950, magazine, as La comète rouge. Serial. Digest in French of the original text.

References

1923 American novels
American science fiction novels
Novels first published in serial form
Works originally published in Weird Tales